Nada Es Igual is a 1999 album by Franco De Vita released on the Sony label. The CD produced "Traigo Una Pena," a Top 5 hit on the Billboard Latin music charts. Other hits from the disc include "Si Tú No Estás" and "Te Veo Venir, Soledad."

Track listing
1. Si tú no estás 
2. Te recordaré
3. Nada es igual 
4. Traigo una pena (Gilberto Santa Rosa, Victor Manuelle y Cheo Feliciano)
5. Cuento con María
6. Te veo venir, Soledad (bachata)
7. Preso de mi propio sentimiento
8. Lluvia
9. Quién lo iba a saber
10. Te veo venir, Soledad (reggae)
11. Lluvia (tonada)

References

1999 albums
Franco De Vita albums